Glenroy is a suburb in Melbourne, Victoria, Australia,  north of Melbourne's Central Business District, located within the City of Merri-bek local government area. Glenroy recorded a population of 23,792 at the 2021 census.

Glenroy is located in the northwest of the City of Merri-bek, and is bounded by the Western Ring Road in the north, the Moonee Ponds Creek in the west, New Road, Victoria Street and Rhodes Parade in the south and West Street, Hilton Street, Box Forest Road and the Upfield railway line in the east.

Prominent features include the private Northern Golf Club, a major retail district centred on the Glenroy railway station and the Northern Memorial Park extension to the Fawkner General Cemetery.

History

The area was originally home to the Wurundjeri people of the Kulin Nation, before British colonisation and settlement of the Melbourne area started in 1835.

The Glenroy Estate bounded by the Moonee Ponds Creek, Camp Road, the Northern Golf Club (inclusively) and Rhodes Parade, was purchased in Sydney in 1838 by speculators Hughes and Hosking. The Camerons may have owned it as part of a Run before survey or just leased it from the speculators, and are credited with giving Glenroy its name. However, Donald Angus Kennedy, who bought the estate in the mid-1840s, bestowed the name according to his 1864 obituary in The Argus. Kennedy's mother was Grace (née Cameron).

Initial development in the area started with a small settlement around the North East railway line at the end of the 19th century, with the Glenroy Post Office opening on 22 October 1888.

After World War II, significant development occurred when organisations such as Australian National Airways, the War Services Homes Commission and the Housing Commission of Victoria developed large areas of Glenroy. Residential development continued rapidly through the 1950s, and a Glenroy East Post Office opened in 1958 (closing in 1977).

Demographics

The next most common countries of birth were India 6.3%, Italy 4.0%, Pakistan 4.0%, Nepal 3.5% and Lebanon 2.4%. 41.6% of people spoke only English at home. Other languages spoken at home included Arabic 8.4%, Italian 6.1%, Urdu 4.5%, Turkish 4.2% and Nepali 3.8%. The most common responses for religion were Catholic 27.2%, Islam 18.7% and No Religion 17.1%.

Historical census data
 1891: 224
 1921: 545
 1947: 1,135
 2001: 18,550
 2006: 18,870

Education 
 Glenroy College
 Glenroy Central Primary School
 Glenroy Private
 Glenroy West Primary School
 Belle Vue Park Primary School
 St Thomas More's Primary School
 Penola Catholic College: Glenroy Campus (7-8)
 Glenroy Specialist School
 Corpus Christi Catholic Primary School
 Ballerrt Murrup College
 Glenroy Private Islamic School

Transport

Bus
Seven bus routes service Glenroy:

 : Eltham station – Glenroy station via Lower Plenty. Operated by Dysons.
 : Eltham station – Glenroy station via Greensborough. Operated by Dysons.
 : Gowrie station – Northland Shopping Centre via Murray Road. Operated by Ventura Bus Lines.
 : Glenroy station – Coburg via Boundary Road and Sydney Road. Operated by Dysons.
 : Glenroy station – Gowrie station via Gowrie Park. Operated by Dysons.
 : Roxburgh Park station – Pascoe Vale station via Meadow Heights, Broadmeadows and Glenroy. Operated by Dysons.
  : Brunswick station – Glenroy station via West Coburg (operates Saturday and Sunday mornings only). Operated by Ventura Bus Lines.

Cycling
The Moonee Ponds Creek Trail and the Western Ring Road Trail provide facilities for recreational and commuting cyclists.

Road
Prominent road infrastructure is also provided, with Pascoe Vale Road running through the east of the suburb and the Western Ring Road forming the suburb's northern boundary. Other arterials within the suburb include Daley Street, Glenroy Road, Hilton Street, Plumpton Avenue, and Widford Street.

Train
Glenroy is served by three railway stations at which Metro Trains operate services to and from the Melbourne CBD. Glenroy and Jacana stations are located on the Craigieburn line in the west of the suburb, whilst Gowrie station is located on the Upfield line, which forms part of the suburb's eastern boundary.

Sport

 Glenroy Football Club, an Australian rules football team, competes in the Essendon District Football League. The club was founded in 1946.
 Golfers play at the course of the Northern Golf Club on Glenroy Road.
 Glenroy is home to the Glenroy Cricket Club, who compete in the VTCA. The club shares their home ground with the Glenroy Football Club and is located on the north-east corner of the Northern Golf Club, on Glenroy Road.
 Glenroy is home to professional track star Mina Eskander.

Landmarks and notable places

The following places in Glenroy are listed in the Victorian Heritage Register:
 H0128    Gowrie, 63-65 Gowrie Street, Glenroy

The following places are covered by Heritage Overlay controls in the Merri-bek Planning Scheme:
 HO205 2 Churchill Street, Glenroy – House
 HO209 127 Glenroy Road, Glenroy – House
 HO210 139 Glenroy Road, Glenroy – House
 HO211 149 Glenroy Road, Glenroy – "Minnawarra"
 HO212 9 Grandview Street, Glenroy – House
 HO213 Hartington Street (cnr Melbourne Avenue), Glenroy – Electricity Substation
 HO222 34 Finchley Avenue, Glenroy
 HO223 Plumpton Avenue, Glenroy – Former St. Matthew's church, c. 1908
 HO225 6 Salisbury Street, Glenroy – "Taringa"
 HO226 21 South Street, Glenroy – Kingsley College (Huningtower)
 HO230 11 Tudor Street, Glenroy – "Buangor"
 HO234 92 Wheatsheaf Road, Glenroy – Shop
 HO235 139 Wheatsheaf Road, Glenroy – Shop and dwelling
 HO236 32 Widford Street (cnr Melbourne Avenue), Glenroy – "Wiseman House"
 HO237 73 Plumpton Avenue, Glenroy – Dwelling

Notable former residents
 The Janoskians

See also
 City of Broadmeadows – Glenroy was previously within this former local government area.

References

 Australian Places – Glenroy

Suburbs of Melbourne
Suburbs of the City of Merri-bek